Commicarpus is a genus of flowering plants belonging to the family Nyctaginaceae. The genus contain some 30 to 35 species which are native to the tropics and subtropics. Most are found in Africa and western Asia, and eight species are native to southern Africa.

Species of the genus are distinguished from one another by details of the anthocarp and the shape and indumentum of the flower's lower coriaceous (or leathery) part. They grow in soil that is rich in calcium, and especially soil with a strong component of heavy metals.

Species
The genus includes the following species:

 Commicarpus adenensis A.G.Mill.
 Commicarpus ambiguus Meikle
 Commicarpus arabicus Meikle
 Commicarpus australis Meikle
 Commicarpus boissieri (Heimerl) Cufod.
 Commicarpus brandegeei Standl.
 Commicarpus chinensis (L.) Heimerl
 Commicarpus coctoris N.A.Harriman
 Commicarpus decipiens Meikle
 Commicarpus fallacissimus Heimerl Ex Oberm., Schweick. & Verdoorn
 Commicarpus grandiflorus (A.Rich.) Standl.
 Commicarpus greenwayi Meikle
 Commicarpus heimerlii (Vierh.) Meikle
 Commicarpus helenae (Roem. & Schult.) Meikle
 Commicarpus hiranensis Thulin
 Commicarpus insularum Meikle
 Commicarpus lantsangensis D.Q.Lu
 Commicarpus mistus Thulin
 Commicarpus montanus Miré, H.Gillet & Quézel
 Commicarpus parviflorus Thulin
 Commicarpus pedunculosus (A.Rich.) Cufod.
 Commicarpus pentandrus (Burch.) Heimerl
 Commicarpus pilosus (Heimerl) Meikle
 Commicarpus plumbagineus (Cav.) Standl.
 Commicarpus praetermissus N.A.Harriman
 Commicarpus ramosissimus Thulin
 Commicarpus raynalii J.-P.Lebrun & Meikle
 Commicarpus reniformis (Chiov.) Cufod.
 Commicarpus scandens (L.) Standl.
 Commicarpus simonyi (Heimerl & Vierh.) Meikle
 Commicarpus sinuatus Meikle
 Commicarpus squarrosus (Heimerl) Standl.
 Commicarpus stenocarpus (Chiov.) Cufod.
 Commicarpus tuberosus (Lam.) Standl.
Govaerts, Rottbøll and Greuter & Burdet have published several combinations in the genus Boerhavia. If these are followed the genus Commicarpus would be much smaller.

Gallery

References

Nyctaginaceae
Caryophyllales genera